{{Speciesbox
| taxon = Conus navarroi
| image =Conus navarroi 1.jpg
| image2 =Conus navarroi 2.jpg
| image_caption = Apertural and abapertural views of shell of Conus navarroi" , E.M., 1986  
| status = NT
| status_system = IUCN3.1 
| status_ref = 
| authority = Rolán, 1986
| synonyms_ref = 
| synonyms =
 Africonus navarroi (Rolán, 1986)
 Conus (Lautoconus) navarroi , 1986 · accepted, alternate representation
| display_parents = 3
}}Conus navarroi is a species of sea snail, a marine gastropod mollusk in the family Conidae, the cone snails and their allies.

Like all species within the genus Conus, these snails are predatory and venomous. They are capable of "stinging" humans, therefore live ones should be handled carefully or not at all. From its morphology and radular characters, it seems an evolutionary line different from other Capeverdian Conus species.

The former subspecies Conus navarroi calhetae , 1990 is a synonym of Conus calhetae , 1990.

Description
The size of the shell varies between 14 mm and 23 mm.

Distribution
This species occurs in the Atlantic Ocean off the islands Santa Luzia and São Vicente, Cape Verde.

References

 Tucker J.K. & Tenorio M.J. (2009) Systematic classification of Recent and fossil conoidean gastropods.'' Hackenheim: Conchbooks. 296 pp.
  Puillandre N., Duda T.F., Meyer C., Olivera B.M. & Bouchet P. (2015). One, four or 100 genera? A new classification of the cone snails. Journal of Molluscan Studies. 81: 1–23

External links
 The Conus Biodiversity website
 Cone Shells - Knights of the Sea
 

navarroi
Gastropods described in 1986
Gastropods of Cape Verde